This is a list of transactions that have taken place during the off-season and the 2018–19 Turkish Women's Basketball League.

Front office movements

Head coach changes
Off-season

Player movement

Free agency

Going overseas

See also
2018-19 Turkish Women's Basketball League season
List of 2018-19 Turkish Women's Basketball League rosters

References

External links 
Official Site

Turkish Women's Basketball League seasons
Women
Turkey
TUR
TUR
basketball
basketball